Rebar, or ReBar, is a gay bar and nightclub in the Chelsea neighborhood of Manhattan in New York City.

Description and history
The bar was established in 2017. One of the co-owners is Frank DiLuzio. In 2017, the bar faced allegations of discrimination by people of color.

In their list of "The 16 Best LGBTQ Bars in New York City" for Thrillist, Melissa Kravitz and Kyler Alvord wrote, "In 2017, REBAR opened where the famed G Lounge once stood, aiming to revive the Chelsea scene. It's still relatively new, but a few things are certain: the layout’s sharp, the staff's sizzling, and the vibe's sexiest when the space fills up during weekend dance parties."

See also
 LGBT culture in New York City

References

External links 
 
 
 

2017 establishments in New York City
Chelsea, Manhattan
LGBT culture in New York City
LGBT nightclubs in New York (state)
Nightclubs in Manhattan